The Sun of St. Moritz may refer to:

 The Sun of St. Moritz (1923 film), a German silent drama film
 The Sun of St. Moritz (1954 film), a West German drama film